Wrong No. (also written as Wrong Number) is a 2015 Pakistani romantic comedy film directed by Yasir Nawaz (in his feature directorial debut) and co-produced by Yasir Nawaz, Nida Yasir and Hassan Zia under the production banner YNH Films. It is the first installment in the Wrong No. film series. The film features Javed Sheikh, Danish Taimoor, Nadeem Jaffri, Danish Nawaz, Shafqat Cheema, Sohai Ali Abro and Janita Asma in lead roles.

The film was released by ARY Films in cinemas nationwide on 18 July 2015 (Eid ul-Fitr).

Plot 
The story revolves around Sallu (Danish Taimoor) who hopes to make it big in showbiz someday. However, his plans have to face the wrath of his father Haji Aba (Javed Sheikh), a family inherited butcher who wants his son to either join the other men of the family and be a butcher or get some government job. Laila (Sohai Ali Abro) is the girl next door, who has a thing for Sallu but Sallu is not interested in her and wants to focus on his career.

While Sallu's story is set in Karachi, there is another track in Lahore featuring Haya (Janita Asma) who flies to Karachi to receive Shehryar (also Danish Taimoor) who arrives from Sydney and is all set to succeed his grandfather and run the company Haya works at. Meanwhile, a dreaded don Shera (Shafqat Cheema) hatches a plan to kidnap Sheheryar for his wealth and sends his top but lazy and fool henchmen (Danish Nawaz and Nauman Jaffery). However, this is in vain as his henchmen are betraying him to take his place in order. Then the story gets a bit twisted and the Wrong Number-ness kicks in.

Cast 
 Javed Sheikh as Haji Abba
 Danish Taimoor as Salman (Sallu) / Shehryar
 Ramiz Siddiqui as papu
 Janita Asma as Haya
 Nayyar Ejaz as Gullu Butt
 Qavi Khan as Nawab
 Shafqat Cheema as Shera
 Sohai Ali Abro as Laila
 Nadeem Jafri as Pappi
 Danish Nawaz as Bali
 Ismail Tara as Saleem
 Tooba Siddiqui as Guest in Nachay Mann Song
 Yasir Nawaz as Cameo as Nawaz Badmash (Rusk Lover)
 Nida Mumtaz as Haji Abba's guest

Production

Marketing 
The film's marketing and distribution rights are held by ARY Films. Speaking with ARY News, the director/producer stated that he was happy and delighted at the support that ARY Digital Network had provided him with and that he was looking forward to the film's release on Eid-ul-Fitr. On 13 April 2015 first look posters were released online by ARY Films. On 15 March, the teaser trailer was revealed on TV channels under ARY Digital Network. Three more posters were revealed on 21 April. A controversial poster featuring Danish Nawaz and characters was revealed on 19 May. On 18 May, another character poster was revealed featuring Shafqat Cheema with his gang, playing the villain's role in the film. The theatrical trailer was revealed on 3 June by TV channels under ARY Digital Network. Two video songs, "Selfiyan" and "Kundi", were released on 15 June, which received a negative response on social media.

In reply to critics, the director said, "When we started writing the film even then we knew we would get good reviews, and we will come across bad people. But the best thing about a making a film is that it’s either a hit or a flop. Either way you find out if the audience liked it or not." Renowned Indian film producer Mahesh Bhatt and Vishal Bhardwaj recorded video messages specifically urging people to watch this film. On the film's release, Javed Sheikh also recorded a video inviting Prime Minister Nawaz Sharif to watch this film in the cinema.

Soundtrack
The music of the film was composed by Waqar Ali.

Release 
The film was premiered in Lahore on 13 July and in Karachi on 15 July 2015. The film released across Pakistan on 79 screens competing Bajrangi Bhaijan and Bin Roye. It also screened in the UK on 26 July and in the UAE on 6 August. Wrong No. was to release in India at a later date. The film was scheduled to be released in the US on 11 December 2015.

Reception

Critical response

Rafay Mahmood of The Express Tribune rated the film 2.5 out of 5 stars and wrote, "It is the small moments and performances by the side actors that make an otherwise ordinary film a joyride. Beyond that, it is a test of your bladder and brain, whatever lets go first."

Momin Ali Munshi of Galaxy Lollywood rated 3.8/5 overall and summed up his review as, "Wrong Number is a complete commercial pot-boiler which has all the elements that are required to make a blockbuster. This masala entertainer will make you fall in love with the characters and will also make sure that you fall off your seat every few minutes courtesy the heavy doses of laughter that will come your way. But be warned that if you are easily offended and rate humour as being clean or dirty then this is surely not your cup of tea."

Asad Haroon of Dispatch News Desk said, "Wrong Number is a slapstick comedy filled with humor. One can't stop laughing throughout the movie and the dialogues are pretty well written and up to the mark. The script of the movie wasn’t predictable that much but the dialogues were totally unpredictable and funny to such an extent that one could say that I didn't see that coming. The production quality of Wrong number is not that great as of Bin Roye but the screen is pretty bright of wrong number."

Box office
The film had a 90% opening day, registering . Tuesday was again a holiday due to Eid, and the film was again 95-100% on Tuesday as it collected . Wednesday was the first working day for the film, but it yet registered 90% occupancies, collecting  on Wednesday. The film collected  on Thursday. In the UK  until the second weekend.

Accolades

See also 
 List of highest-grossing Pakistani films
 List of Pakistani films of 2015

References

External links 
 Official website
 

2015 directorial debut films
2015 films
Pakistani romantic comedy films
2015 romantic comedy films
2010s Urdu-language films
Lollywood films
Films set in Karachi
Pakistani action comedy films